2016 V-Varen Nagasaki season.

J2 League

References

External links
 J.League official site

V-Varen Nagasaki
V-Varen Nagasaki seasons